Shuangliu West railway station is a railway station located in Shuangliu District, Chengdu, Sichuan, on the Chengdu–Mianyang–Leshan intercity railway which also serves as a transfer station between Line 3 and Line 10 of the Chengdu Metro.

History
The station opened on 20 December 2014 for Chengdu-Leshan train services. Chengdu–Mianyang–Leshan intercity railway services commenced on 10 January 2016.

Chengdu Metro

Shuangliu West Station is a transfer station on Line 3 and Line 10 of the Chengdu Metro in China. It serves the nearby Shuangliu West railway station.

Station layout

Gallery

References

Railway stations in Sichuan
Railway stations in China opened in 2014
Chengdu Metro stations